Amin Aghaei (born 24 April 1982 in Isfahan, Iran) is an Iranian painter and sculptor. He also worked as a cartoonist for years.

Biography 
He was supposed to be born in Khorramshahr; but the beginning of the war and occupation of the city destined Amin Aghaei to be born in war displacements in 1982 in Isfahan. 

He studied art at the  Art University of Tehran and after several years of work in the field of cartoon, he is currently a painter and sculptor.

Solo Exhibition 

 "Tajrobeh (Experience)", 01.2018–02.2018, Naranj Gallery, Shiraz, Fars, Iran
 “I Am Looking At You Through The Crack Of Door (Az Posht-E Shekaf-E Dar Be To Negah Mikonam)", 05.2015, Aun Gallery, Tehran, Iran
 "Labe Karoun (At The Karun’s Bank)", 02. 2013 – 03.2013, Aun Gallery, Tehran, Iran
 Solo Cartoon Exhibition, 12.2011, Pabianika Gallery, Pabianika, Poland
 Solo Illustration Exhibition, 01.2010, Ideh Gallery,Tehran, Iran

Group Exhibition (Selection) 

 "Iranian Artists And Their Preception Of Mexico Exhibition", 12.2018, Cultural Section Of Mexico Embassy, Tehran, Iran
 Tehran Animation Walk, "Animation Experiment" Collective in Collaboration With Asifa – Iran And New Media Society, 11.2018,Tehran, Iran
 Drawing Exhibition, 05.2018, Haft Samar Gallery, Tehran, Iran
 "7.3 Richter" Group Painting Exhibition, 12.2017, White Line Art Gallery, Tehran, Iran
 "1001 Under Glaze Plates (1001 Plates), 11.2016, Shirin Gallery, Tehran, Iran
 "In Khaneh (This House)" 09.2016, Iranshahr Gallery, Tehran, Iran
 "Characteristic", 12.2015, Vista Art Gallery, Tehran, Iran
 "The Great Game 56th International Venice Biennial", 05.2015, Venice, Italy
 "Paper" Group Exhibition, 04.2015, Dubai, UAE
 "Beyond Boundaries (Animation In New Art)" 9th Tehran Animation Biannual Group Exhibition, 03.2015, Tehran, Iran
 Nowrouz (Persian New Year), 03.2015, Aun Gallery, Tehran, Iran
 "The Joint Project Of Iran And Rio" Exhibition, 09.2014, Largo Gallery, Rio De Janeiro, Brazil

See also 

 List of Iranian painters

References

External links
Mohammad Amin Aghai's Official Website
Mohammad amin aghaei in Irancartoon

Iranian painters
Iranian illustrators
Iranian cartoonists
People from Ahvaz
1982 births
Living people